Sokac may refer to:

 Sokač, a surname
 Šokac (disambiguation)